Edmond Boddam  (23 November 1879 – 9 September 1959) was an Australian cricketer. He played five first-class matches for Tasmania between 1910 and 1914.

He served with the Army Medical Corps in World War I and was awarded the MC in the 1916 Birthday Honours.

See also
 List of Tasmanian representative cricketers

References

External links
 

1879 births
1959 deaths
Australian recipients of the Military Cross
Australian military personnel of World War I
Australian cricketers
Tasmania cricketers
Cricketers from Hobart